Matobo, originally Matopos, is a district of the Province Matabeleland South in Zimbabwe.

References

Districts of Matabeleland South Province